Dr. Shyama Prasad Mukherjee University, formerly Ranchi College, is a  state university located in Ranchi, Jharkhand, India. It is named after the Indian politician Shyama Prasad Mukherjee. It was established as a college in 1926 and upgraded to a university in 2017.

History
Ranchi College was established as a government intermediate college in 1926, and begun undergraduate and postgraduate courses in 1946. Following the Indian independence it operated as unit of Patna University. It became a unit of Ranchi University upon its creation in 1960 and became autonomous in 2009. In 2017 it was upgraded to a state university through the Jharkhand State Universities (Amendment) Act, 2017.

See also
Education in India
List of state universities in India
List of institutions of higher education in Jharkhand

References

External links

Universities and colleges in Ranchi
2017 establishments in Jharkhand
1926 establishments in India
Educational institutions established in 1926
Educational institutions established in 2017
State universities in Jharkhand